The Chicago Sister Cities International Cup often abbreviated as "CSCIC" was a friendly tournament being hosted by the Chicago Fire. The tournament invited football clubs from Chicago's sister cities of Belgrade, Paris and Warsaw to come to Chicago and play against the Fire. Paris Saint-Germain, Red Star and Legia Warsaw were the clubs chosen to represent their respective cities.

Tournament
The Chicago Sister Cities International Cup got very good media attention for a friendly tournament. The mayor of Chicago Richard M. Daley even proclaimed May 19–22 Chicago Sister Cities International Cup Days. In the proclamation, Mayor Daley had great words about the sport stating that it "brings together athletes in friendly competition, and forges new relationships bound by mutual admiration, solidarity and fair play...and urge all citizens to celebrate the close ties of friendship and exchange that Chicago shares with Warsaw, Paris and Belgrade." Mayor Daley received jerseys from all four clubs and welcomed them to their sister city. Media outlets in Poland, Serbia and France covered the games and almost all had very positive reviews on the concept of the tournament. At the start of the tournament the Chicago Fire elected to take on PSG with Red Star v Legia following immediately after. The two winners booked their tickets for the final for the inaugural season while the two losers would have a consolation match for third place.

2010
Semi-finals

 

Third place match

Final

References

American soccer friendly trophies
Sisters
2010 in American soccer
2009–10 in French football
2009–10 in Serbian football
2009–10 in Polish football